Ana Temprano (born 28 January 1984) is a former Spanish handball player for the Spanish national team.

References

1984 births
Living people
Spanish female handball players
Sportspeople from Oviedo